Gerald Edward Brown (born July 22, 1926 in Brookings, South Dakota; † May 31, 2013 in New York City) was an American theoretical physicist who worked on nuclear physics and astrophysics. Since 1968 he had been a professor at the Stony Brook University. He was a distinguished professor emeritus of the C. N. Yang Institute for Theoretical Physics at Stony Brook University.

Life and work 
Brown received his bachelor's degree in physics in 1946 from the University of Wisconsin and in 1948 his master's degree from Yale University, where in 1950 he earned his PhD. In 1957 he earned his D.Sc. from the University of Birmingham in England (under Rudolf Peierls), where he was from 1955 docent and in 1959/60 was professor for theoretical physics. From 1960 to 1985 he was a professor at NORDITA in Copenhagen and concurrently from 1964 to 1968 Professor at Princeton and since 1968 he was a professor at the State University of New York at Stony Brook, where he became Distinguished Professor of Physics in 1988.

Brown worked first in theoretical atomic physics (self-ionization of the vacuum with Geoff Ravenhall in 1951, Lamb shift in heavy atoms, electron-electron interactions, precise calculation of Rayleigh scattering). In nuclear physics, where he was for decades one of the leading theorists of nuclear many body problems in particle physics, he worked, for example, with Mark Bolsteri on the giant dipole resonance, with Tom Kuo on effective interactions of nucleons in atomic nuclei, as well on chiral invariant theories of the atomic nucleus (with Mannque Rho and Dan-Olof Riska), that is to say, field theories with pions and other mesons. Starting in the 1970s he worked frequently in collaboration with Hans Bethe on the nuclear-physics-derived equations of state in the theory of compact stars (gravitational collapse, supernovae, double stars with compact stars as partners, development of black holes, gamma ray bursts). Since the end of the 1970s, Brown worked on bag models of nucleons (Chiral bag model). In the 1980s he also worked together with K. Bedell on Fermi liquid theory. Toward the end of Bethe's life, Bethe told Brown to explain his work to the rest of the world.

Awards and recognition
Brown received an honorary doctorate from the Helsinki (1982), Birmingham (1990) and Copenhagen (1998).
Fellow of The Royal Danish Academy of Sciences and Letters
Fellow of the American Physical Society
1966 Silver Medal of the University of Helsinki
1974 Haederspris of the Niels Bohr Institute
 1975 Fellow of the American Academy of Arts and Sciences
 1976 Boris Pregel Award of the New York Academy of Sciences
 1978 Academician of the National Academy of Sciences
 1982 Tom W. Bonner Prize in Nuclear Physics of the American Physical Society
 1992 John Price Wetherill Medal of the Franklin Institute
 1996 Max Planck Medal of the Deutschen Physikalischen Gesellschaft
 2001 Hans A. Bethe Prize of the American Physical Society
 Fellow of the Norwegian Academy of Science and Letters.

Selected works 
 "Unified theory of nuclear models", North Holland, Interscience 1964, new edition entitled "Unified theory of nuclear models and forces", North Holland 1967, 1971
 with A. D. Jackson "The Nucleon Nucleon Interaction", North Holland 1976
 "Many body problems", North Holland 1972
 with Ravenhall "On the interaction of two electrons", Proceedings of the Royal Society A 208, 1951, 552
 with Bolsteri "Dipole state in nuclei", Physical Review Letters, Bd.3, 1959, 472
 "Die Entdeckung der Multipol-Riesenresonanzen in Atomkernen", Physikalische Blätter 1997, S.710 (Vortrag aus Anlass der Verleihung der Max Planck Medaille der DPG)
 with Kuo "Structure of finite nuclei and the free Nucleon-Nucleon interaction: an application to O18 and F18", Nuclear Physics A, Bd.85, 1966, S.40–86
 
 with Rho "Towards a basis in QCD for nuclear physics", Comments on Nuclear and Particle Physics Bd. 16, 1986, 245
 
 "The structure of the Nucleon", Physics Today January 1983
 with Zahed "The Skyrme Model", Physics Reports, Bd.142, 1986, S.1–102
 with Weise, Baym, Speth "Relativistic effects in nuclear physics", Comments on Nuclear and Particle Physics, Bd. 17, 1987, 37
 with Bethe, Applegate, Lattimer "Evolution of state in the gravitational collapse of stars", Nuclear Physics A 324, 1979, S.487
 
 with Bethe "How a Supernova explodes", Scientific American Mai 1985

References

External links 
 Dr. Brown's faculty page
 Homepage of the Nuclear Theory Group of SUNY in Stony Brook
 Biography of Brown from the APS
Stories about Gerry Brown
FROM NUCLEI TO STARS – Festschrift in Honor of Gerald E Brown

American physicists
1926 births
2013 deaths
University of Wisconsin–Madison College of Letters and Science alumni
Yale University alumni
Stony Brook University faculty
Members of the Norwegian Academy of Science and Letters
Members of the United States National Academy of Sciences
Alumni of the University of Birmingham
People from Brookings, South Dakota
Fellows of the American Physical Society
Winners of the Max Planck Medal